Borja Sánchez Laborde (born 26 February 1996) is a Spanish footballer who plays for Real Oviedo as an attacking midfielder.

Club career
Born in Oviedo, Asturias, Sánchez joined Real Madrid's youth system in 2011, aged 15, from hometown Real Oviedo. On 29 July 2015, after finishing his graduation, he was loaned to Segunda División B side CF Fuenlabrada, for one year.

Sánchez made his senior debut on 23 August 2015, coming on as a second-half substitute for Jean Carlos in a 3–0 away win against Getafe CF B. His first goal came on 25 October, netting his team's third in a 3–3 draw at CD Ebro.

A regular starter under Fernando Morientes, Sánchez returned to Castilla in July 2016, but was rarely used. On 31 January 2017, he moved to another reserve team, RCD Mallorca B also in the third division, on loan until the end of the season.

On 4 August 2017, Sánchez returned to Oviedo, signing a one-year loan deal and being assigned to the B-team in Tercera División. On 13 July 2018, after achieving promotion to the third level, he signed a permanent contract with the club after terminating his link with Real Madrid.

Sánchez made his first-team debut on 28 October 2018, replacing Joselu in a 1–2 away defeat to Gimnàstic de Tarragona in the Segunda División championship. The following 29 January, he renewed his contract until 2022, being definitely promoted to the main squad for the following campaign.

Sánchez scored his first professional goal on 13 October 2019, netting the winner in a 2–1 away defeat of Albacete Balompié.

References

External links
Real Madrid official profile 

Living people
1996 births
Footballers from Oviedo
Spanish footballers
Association football midfielders
Segunda División players
Segunda División B players
Tercera División players
Real Madrid Castilla footballers
CF Fuenlabrada footballers
RCD Mallorca B players
Real Oviedo Vetusta players
Real Oviedo players
Spain youth international footballers